In the 1996–97 season Olympiacos became the 8th club in the history of European Basketball and also the 1st club in the history of Greek basketball that made the Triple Crown achievement having won the Greek Basketball Cup, the FIBA EuroLeague and the Greek Basket League.

The roster
  Efthimis Bakatsias 4.
  Giorgos Sigalas 5.
  Dimitrios Papanikolaou 7.
  Nasos Galakteros 8.
   Franko Nakić 9.
  Panagiotis Fasoulas 10.
   Milan Tomić 11.
   Dragan Tarlać 12.
  Chris Welp 13.
   Aleksey Savrasenko 14.
  David Rivers 15. (Final Four MVP) 
  Vassilis Soulis
   Anatoly Zourpenko

 Coach:  Dušan Ivković

Greek Cup

2nd round

|}

Top 16

|}

Quarterfinals

|}

Semifinals
April 12, O.A.C.A. Olympic Indoor Hall, Athens

|}

Final
April 13, O.A.C.A. Olympic Indoor Hall, Athens

|}

FIBA EuroLeague

1st round

Day 1, 19/09/1996

|}
Day 2, 26/09/1996

|}
Day 3, 03/10/1996

|}
Day 4, 10/10/1996

|}
Day 5, 17/10/1996

|}

Day 6, 06/11/1996

|}
Day 7, 13/11/1996

|}
Day 8, 21/11/1996

|}
Day 9, 05/12/1996

|}
Day 10, 12/12/1996

|}

2nd round

Day 1, 09/01/1997

|}
Day 2, 16/01/1997

|}
Day 3, 13/01/1997

|}

Day 4, 06/02/1997

|}
Day 5, 13/11/1996

|}
Day 6, 21/11/1996

|}

Top 16

|}

Quarterfinals

|}

Final Four

Semifinals
April 22, Palaeur, Rome

|}

Final
April 24, Palaeur, Rome

|}

Greek League

References

1996–97 in Greek basketball
1996-1997